Kipling Generating Station is one of four stations in the Lower Mattagami River Hydroelectric Complex. The station is jointly owned by Ontario Power Generation (OPG; 75%) and the Moose Cree First Nation (25%). Kipling GS was originally commissioned as a 2-unit, 155 MW generating station in 1966 by OPG's predecessor, Ontario Hydro. OPG completed a $2.6 billion construction project covering the four Lower Mattagami dams in 2014 and 2015, and added a third generating unit with 78.3 MW capacity to Kipling GS, bringing the total station capacity to 233.3 MW.

See also 

 List of power stations in Canada
 List of generating stations in Ontario

References

External links 
 OPG Kipling GS page
 
 OPG Lower Mattagami project site

Hydroelectric power stations in Ontario
Ontario Power Generation
Energy infrastructure completed in 1966
Energy infrastructure completed in 2014
Ontario Hydro
Dams in Ontario
Gravity dams
Dams completed in 1966
1966 establishments in Ontario
Joint ventures